Opacuincola cervicesmadentes is a critically endangered species of freshwater snail endemic to New Zealand.

Habitat 
Opacuincola cervicesmadentes has been found in only one location at the Charing Cross entrance of Wet Neck Cave, west of Mangarākau and Collingwood. The population trend of this snail is unknown at present but it is regarded as potentially threatened by habitat destruction, agricultural work and caving pursuits.

Conservation status 
In November 2018 the Department of Conservation classified Opacuincola cervicesmadentes as Nationally Critical under the New Zealand Threat Classification System. The species was judged as meeting the criteria for Nationally Critical threat status as a result of it occupying a total area of less than 1 hectare. It is found only in one location and is also classified as Data Poor under that system.

References

External links 
Image of the holotype specimen held at Museum of New Zealand Te Papa Tongarewa

Gastropods described in 2008
Endangered biota of New Zealand
Gastropods of New Zealand
Tateidae